Adam Lamberg (born September 14, 1984) is an American former actor, best known for his portrayal of David "Gordo" Gordon in the Disney Channel series Lizzie McGuire from 2001 through 2004, and in The Lizzie McGuire Movie.

Early life
Adam Lamberg was born in New York City, New York on September 14, 1984. His father is Jewish, whereas his mother is French-Canadian. Lamberg described himself as a "cultural Jew".

Before joining the reboot series, he worked at the Irish Arts Center in Manhattan.

Later works
In 2019, it was announced that he would reprise his role as David "Gordo" Gordon in a Lizzie McGuire  revival for Disney+ but Disney later decided to not go forward with the revival.

Filmography

References

External links

 

1984 births
20th-century American male actors
21st-century American male actors
Male actors from New York City
American male child actors
American male film actors
American male television actors
American people of French-Canadian descent
Jewish American male actors
Living people
University of California, Berkeley alumni
21st-century American Jews